Juan Gabriel Valdés Soublette (Santiago, June 2, 1947) is a Chilean political scientist, diplomat and former minister during the Eduardo Frei Ruiz-Tagle presidency. Between 1973 and 1976 he studied political science at Princeton University in the United States, where he obtained a Ph.D.

In 2014, Chilean President Michelle Bachelet appointed Valdés as Chilean Ambassador to the United States.

From 2000 to 2003, Valdes was Chile's Ambassador to the United Nations.

He is the son of composer Sylvia Soublette and Gabriel Valdes, who also served as a Chilean diplomat.

Other activities

Juan Gabriel Valdés is a Member of the Global Leadership Foundation, an organization which works to support democratic leadership, prevent and resolve conflict through mediation and promote good governance in the form of democratic institutions, open markets, human rights and the rule of law. It does so by making available, discreetly and in confidence, the experience of former leaders to today's national leaders. It is a not-for-profit organization composed of former heads of government, senior governmental and international organization officials who work closely with Heads of Government on governance-related issues of concern to them.

References

1947 births
Living people
People from Santiago
Ambassadors of Chile to the United States
Permanent Representatives of Chile to the United Nations
Chilean diplomats
Chilean political scientists
Pontifical Catholic University of Chile alumni
Alumni of the University of Essex
Princeton University alumni
Socialist Party of Chile politicians